The 2014–15 Scottish League Two is the 20th season in the current format of 10 teams in the fourth tier of Scottish football. The last placed team entered a play-off with the winners of the Highland League (Brora Rangers) and Lowland League (Edinburgh City) to determine which team entered League Two in the 2015–16 season.

Teams

Stadia and locations

Personnel

League table

Results

First half of season

Second half of season

League Two play-offs
The semi-final was contested by the winners of the Highland League (Brora Rangers) and Lowland League (Edinburgh City). The winning club then played off against the bottom club in League Two, which was Montrose, to decide the club taking a place in League Two for the 2015–16 season.  Had Montrose lost their League Two status, they would have dropped down to the next season's Highland League.

Semi-final

First leg

Second leg

Final

First leg

Second leg

References

Scottish League Two seasons
4
4
Scot